was the pen-name of Gotō Toranosuke, a Japanese essayist, novella writer, and literary critic active from the late Meiji through the early Shōwa periods of Japan.

Biography
Born in the rural Senboku District of Akita prefecture (in what is now the city of Daisen, Gotō graduated from the Tokyo Semmon Gakko (present-day Waseda University). From 1900, he served as editor of the literary magazine Shinshōsetsu ("New Fiction"). Some of the writers who contributed to the magazine during his tenure were members of the Ken'yūsha literary society, including  Hirotsu Ryurō, Kyōka Izumi, Shimazaki Toson, Natsume Sōseki and Nagai Kafū. He was strongly critical of the naturalism movement, which began to become popular around that time. His works include a novella, Funikudan (1899), and a collection of essays, Hi shizen shugi (1908).

See also 
 Japanese literature
 List of Japanese authors

References

External links 

 e-text of works at Aozora Bunko (Japanese)

1866 births
1938 deaths
Japanese essayists
19th-century Japanese novelists
20th-century Japanese novelists
Writers from Akita Prefecture
Waseda University alumni
19th-century essayists
20th-century essayists